Jordan Harris may refer to:

 Jordan Harris (ice hockey) (born 2000), American hockey player
 Jordan A. Harris, American politician from Pennsylvania

